Jawahar Navodaya Vidyalaya, Madhubani is a co-educational central government residential school in Rampatti village in Madhubani district in the Indian state of Bihar. JNV Madhubani was established in 1986 by Navodaya Vidyalaya Samiti, a registered Society under Registration of Societies Act, 1860 and an autonomous body under the Department of School Education & Literacy, Ministry of Human Resource Development, Govt. of India. The school primarily aims at identification and development of talented school children predominantly from rural areas who lack access to good educational opportunities.

Affiliations 
JNV Madhubani is affiliated with Central Board of Secondary Education (CBSE) and follows the prescribed syllabus.

See also 
 Jawahar Navodaya Vidyalaya

References

External links 
 JNVRM Website
 NVS Official Website
 All India JNV Alumni Committee Website

Jawahar Navodaya Vidyalayas in Bihar
Boarding schools in Bihar
1986 establishments in Bihar
Educational institutions established in 1986